György Baló (14 June 1947 – 18 March 2019) was a Hungarian broadcast journalist and academic lecturer, who served as anchorman for various political talk shows of the Hungarian public television channel Magyar Televízió (MTV) since the 1970s.

References

1947 births
2019 deaths
Eötvös Loránd University alumni
Journalists from Budapest
Hungarian television presenters
Hungarian radio presenters
Television people from Budapest